Odette Lapierre (born January 28, 1955 in Charny, Quebec) is a former long-distance runner from Canada, who competed in the women's marathon at two consecutive Summer Olympics for her native country, starting in 1988. After having finished in 11th place (2:30:56) in Seoul, South Korea she ended up in 19th place (2:46.18), four years later in Barcelona, Spain.

Achievements

References

External links
 
 
 
 
 
 

1955 births
Living people
Canadian female long-distance runners
Athletes (track and field) at the 1986 Commonwealth Games
Athletes (track and field) at the 1988 Summer Olympics
Athletes (track and field) at the 1990 Commonwealth Games
Athletes (track and field) at the 1992 Summer Olympics
Olympic track and field athletes of Canada
Sportspeople from Quebec
Commonwealth Games bronze medallists for Canada
Commonwealth Games medallists in athletics
World Athletics Championships athletes for Canada
Université Laval alumni
Medallists at the 1986 Commonwealth Games